Stevens Cliff is a cliff between Tiger Island and Cape Archer along the north side of Granite Harbour, Victoria Land. The cliff is straight, 3 nautical miles (6 km) long and rises 200 m above the sea. Named after Alan R. Stevens, Chief, Science and Application Branch, National Mapping Division. As chief of the Science and Application Branch, he was instrumental to United States Geological Survey (USGS) Antarctic mapping and geodesy programs during the 1990s. He worked in the McMurdo Sound area as a member of the USGS 1994-95 Antarctic field program.

References

Cliffs of Victoria Land
Scott Coast